Roman Patrick Banks is a former American basketball coach and the current athletic director at Southern University. Banks previously served as the head men's basketball coach for the Southern Jaguars before he was promoted to AD on March 31, 2017.

Head coaching record

References

1969 births
Living people
American men's basketball players
Basketball coaches from Louisiana
Basketball players from Shreveport, Louisiana
College men's basketball head coaches in the United States
High school basketball coaches in Louisiana
Northwestern State Demons basketball players
Point guards
Southeastern Louisiana Lions basketball coaches
Southern Jaguars basketball coaches
Southern Jaguars and Lady Jaguars athletic directors